Flovia Ng is a Malaysian politician who has served as the State Assistant Minister of Community Development and People's Wellbeing of Sabah in the Gabungan Rakyat Sabah (GRS) state administration under Chief Minister Hajiji Noor and Ministers Shahelmey Yahya as well as James Ratib since October 2020 and Member of the Sabah State Legislative Assembly (MLA) for Tulid since September 2020. She is a member of the Homeland Solidarity Party (STAR), a component party of the GRS coalition.

Election results

Honours 
 :
  Commander of the Order of Kinabalu (PGDK) – Datuk  (2022)

References

Members of the Sabah State Legislative Assembly
Homeland Solidarity Party politicians
Living people
Year of birth missing (living people)